OBUXUM is the stage name of Muxubo Mohamed, a Somalian-Canadian electronic music producer. She is most noted for her album Re-Birth, which was longlisted for the 2020 Polaris Music Prize.

She debuted with the EP H.E.R. in 2018. Re-Birth, her full-length debut, was released in 2019.

She produced the song "In Women Colour" from Haviah Mighty's 2019 album 13th Floor.

References

Canadian electronic musicians
Canadian hip hop record producers
Canadian people of Somali descent
Black Canadian musicians
Black Canadian women
Living people
Canadian women in electronic music
Year of birth missing (living people)